The Dr. James Patrick House is a historic house at 370 North Williams Drive in Fayetteville, Arkansas.  Set on a steeply pitched lot on Mount Sequoyah, it is a basically linear single-story structure sited well away from the road to maximize its eastward view.  It has a low-pitch roof and is finished in glass and brick.  It is functionally divided by a carport near its center, with public rooms on one side and private ones the other.  It was built in 1965–66 to a design by Ernie Jacks, who had previously worked with Edward Durell Stone.  It is a distinctive local example of Mid-Century Modern architecture, in a neighborhood principally populated with more conventional vernacular buildings of the period.

The house was listed on the National Register of Historic Places in 2017.

See also
National Register of Historic Places listings in Washington County, Arkansas

References

Houses on the National Register of Historic Places in Arkansas
Houses completed in 1966
Houses in Fayetteville, Arkansas
National Register of Historic Places in Fayetteville, Arkansas